Santa Maria degli Angeli a Pizzofalcone is a Baroque-style church in Naples, Italy.

A church, designed by Francesco Grimaldi, was built at the site for the Theatine Order. Construction started in 1587 and was completed in 1610.

The interior is decorated with paintings by  Giordano, and Andrea Vaccaro. The central nave and transept ceilings were frescoed Scenes from the Life of the Virgin (1668-1675) by Giovanni Battista Beinaschi. The Cupola was frescoed with a Coronation of the Virgin. Some of these frescoes suffered damage from aerial bombing during the second World War.
Francesco Maria Caselli painted the large canvases in the apse and transept. In the Chapel of the Immaculate Conception is a canvas depicting the Virgin by Massimo Stanzione, while Giovanni Bernardo Azzolino decorated the first and third chapels on the left side. In the choir is a canvas of San Gaetano (1662) by Luca Giordano. The main altar by Giovanni Battista Broggia was made in Neoclassic style.  It has a canvas by Paolo De Matteis depicting Sant'Andrea in Extasis.

Sources

 Portions derived from Italian Wikipedia entry.

External links

Basilica churches in Naples
Baroque architecture in Naples
17th-century Roman Catholic church buildings in Italy
Roman Catholic churches completed in 1610
1610 establishments in the Kingdom of Sicily
1610 establishments in Italy